Vivaahithare Ithile (This way, couples) is a 1986 Indian Malayalam-language film, directed by Balachandra Menon and produced by Varada Balachandra Menon. The film stars Parvathy, (in her debut film) Jagathy Sreekumar, Innocent and K. P. A. C. Lalitha. The film has musical score by Jerry Amaldev.

Plot
Appu (Balachandra Menon) is an unmarried storekeeper who works in Ooty. Kurianchan (Innocent) works with Appu and lives with his wife (K. P. A. C. Lalitha) and kids.

Cast
 
 Srividya 
 Jagathy Sreekumar 
 Innocent 
 K. P. A. C. Lalitha 
 Balachandra Menon 
 Kottayam Santha 
 Sankaradi 
 Kuthiravattam Pappu 
 Lalithasree 
 Latha Thomas
 Manimala
 Master Prashobh 
 Parvathy Jayaram (voiced by Bhagyalakshmi)
 Ragini 
 Sreenath 
 T. P. Madhavan 
 Vidhu Krishnan
 Yadu Krishnan
 Neelu (voiced by Poojappura Ravi)

Soundtrack
The music was composed by Jerry Amaldev.

References

External links
 

1986 films
1980s Malayalam-language films
Films directed by Balachandra Menon
Films scored by Jerry Amaldev